Georg Kühling (November 18, 1886 – March 26, 1963) was a German politician of the Christian Democratic Union (CDU) and former member of the German Bundestag.

Life 
From 23 May 1946 to 6 November 1946, he was a member of the Appointed Oldenburg State Parliament and subsequently from 9 December 1946 to 28 March 1947 of the Appointed Lower Saxony State Parliament. He was a member of the German Bundestag from its first election in 1949 until 1953. He was a directly elected member of parliament for the constituency of Vechta - Cloppenburg.

Literature

References

1886 births
1963 deaths
Members of the Bundestag for Lower Saxony
Members of the Bundestag 1949–1953
Members of the Bundestag for the Christian Democratic Union of Germany
Members of the Landtag of Lower Saxony